Abdoul Abass Guiro (born 19 October 1994) is a Burkinabé international footballer who plays for as a midfielder.

Career
Born in Abidjan, Ivory Coast, he has played club football for KOZAF, Bobo Sport, ASF Bobo Dioulasso, Étoile Filante, Raja Beni Mellal and Becamex Binh Duong.

He made his international debut for Burkina Faso in 2017.

References

External links

1994 births
Living people
Burkinabé footballers
Burkinabé expatriate footballers
Burkina Faso international footballers
KOZAF players
Bobo Sport players
ASF Bobo Dioulasso players
Étoile Filante de Ouagadougou players
Botola players
Association football midfielders
Burkinabé expatriate sportspeople in Morocco
Expatriate footballers in Morocco
Footballers from Abidjan
21st-century Burkinabé people
Becamex Binh Duong FC players
Burkinabé expatriate sportspeople in Vietnam
Expatriate footballers in Vietnam
V.League 1 players
Burkina Faso A' international footballers
2018 African Nations Championship players